"Lady" is a song written by Dennis Wilson, recorded by him with Daryl Dragon and released under the name "Dennis Wilson & Rumbo" in the United Kingdom on 4 December 1970, on Stateside Records. The song served as the B-side of the "Sound of Free" single. The single was not issued in the United States.

The single was Dennis Wilson's first solo release.  On both songs, Wilson performed the lead vocals with Daryl Dragon playing instruments.  Dragon and his wife, Toni Tennille, would later become famous as Captain & Tennille.

Proposed  releases
Also known as "Fallin' In Love", the song was reportedly originally written for the unreleased Beach Boys' album Add Some Music. That album later evolved into the 1970 release Sunflower, which did not include "Lady". The song has also been rumoured to have been considered for the album that became Surf's Up, but again passed over for the eventual release.

Although a fairly obscure song, it was performed by The Beach Boys, as seen on the 25 February 1971 edition of The David Frost Show. When asked what inspired the song, Dennis replied, "My lovely wife, she's an inspiration." Dennis was at the time married to Barbara Charren.

Both songs from the single were part of a legal dispute between Capitol and Brother records, making both songs out of print for decades. The original mono single mix of "Lady" saw release in 2005 on the Super Furry Animals compiled Under The Influence - A Collection of Musical Influences & Inspirations released in 2005, although this version is thought to be lossy sourced.

A new mix of the song, featuring a newly created introduction (edited together from later parts of the track), extended instrumental passages and additional vocals from both Dennis and Carl Wilson features on the Beach Boys' 2009 compilation album Summer Love Songs.  This version was created and mixed by Mark Linett, and is credited to The Beach Boys rather than Dennis Wilson & Rumbo.

A rerecording of the song, titled "Flowers Come In The Spring", was done in 1977.  Recorded either during or just after the sessions for what became Pacific Ocean Blue, it was considered for inclusion on his then-unreleased follow-up Bambu.

Personnel

Credits from Craig Slowinski

Dennis Wilson and Rumbo
Daryl Dragon - piano, bass guitar
Dennis Wilson - lead vocals, harmonium, Maestro Rhythm King MRK-2 drum machine

Additional musicians
Michel Colombier - string arrangement
Alvin Dinkin - viola
Sam Freed - violin
David Frisina - violin
Allan Harstian - viola
Igor Horoshevsky - cello
Al Jardine - electric guitars
Anatol Kaminsky - violin
Nathan Kaproff - violin
George Kast - violin
Marvin Limonick - violin
Abe Luboff - arco double bass
Edgar Lustgarten - cello
Virginia Majewski - viola
Alexander Murray - violin
Robert Ostrowsky - viola
Dorothy Wade - violin
Carl Wilson - electric & acoustic guitars

Cover versions 
A cover version of the song under the title "Fallin' in Love" by American Spring appeared on the B-side of their 1973 single Shyin' Away. American Spring featured The Honeys members Marilyn Rovell and her sister Diane, without their cousin Ginger Blake. Dennis Wilson's brother, Brian Wilson, was at the time married to Marilyn. The song featured her on lead vocals, as well as a new instrumental and vocal arrangement by Brian Wilson. It was produced by Brian Wilson, Stephen Desper and David Sandler.  Although the single sold poorly, it has since become a sought-after collectible. The Shyin' Away single was later reissued as a part of the rereleased Spring album by Rhino Records in 1988. Both songs from the single were also released on the 2004 compilation CD, Pet Projects: The Brian Wilson Productions.

The English band Lush covered the song as "Fallin' in Love" on their 1991 EP release Black Spring.

In 2000, the song was covered and released as the opening track on the Beach Boys tribute album Caroline Now!: The Songs of Brian Wilson and the Beach Boys. That version was performed by Eugene Kelly.

The Swedish pop band Sambassadeur covered "Fallin' in Love" on their 2008 album Migration.

Britta Phillips covered "Fallin' in Love" on her 2016 album Luck or Magic.

In 2020, the French pop singer Etienne Daho covered "Falling in love" on his album "Surf"

References

1970 singles
Dennis Wilson songs
Songs written by Dennis Wilson
Song recordings produced by Dennis Wilson
1970 songs